The Greater Poland Voivodeship Sejmik is the regional legislature of the Voivodeship of Greater Poland. It is a unicameral parliamentary body consisting of thirty-nine councillors elected to a five-year term. The current chairperson of the assembly is Małgorzata Waszak-Klepka.

The assembly elects the executive board that acts as the collective executive for the regional government, headed by the province's marshal. The current Executive Board of Greater Poland is a coalition government between Civic Coalition, Polish People's Party and  Democratic Left Alliance with Marek Woźniak of Civic Coalition presiding as marshal.

The assembly meets in the Marshal's Office in Poznań.

Districts 

Members of the Assembly are elected from six districts, serve five-year terms. Districts does not have the constituencies formal names. Instead, each constituency has a number, territorial description.

Composition

1998

2002

2006

2010

2014

2018

Charts

See also 
 Polish Regional Assembly
 Greater Poland Voivodeship

References

External links 
 Official website
 Executive board official website

Greater Poland
Assembly
Unicameral legislatures